The HTC Touch 3G is a Windows Mobile smartphone developed by the High Tech Computer Corporation of Taiwan. It was announced in September 2008 and released the following November. Part of the HTC Touch Family, it features quad band GSM and dual band UMTS connectivity, as well as a version of the proprietary TouchFLO 3D user interface developed by HTC.

Specifications 
The following specifications are those found on the HTC website.
Screen size: 
Screen resolution: 320 x 240
Qualcomm MSM7225 528 MHz processor
RAM: 192 MB
ROM: 256 MB
Quad band GSM/GPRS/EDGE (GSM 850, GSM 900, GSM 1800, GSM 1900)
Dual band UMTS/HSDPA/HSUPA (UMTS 900, UMTS 2100)
GPS and A-GPS
Wi-Fi (802.11b/g)
Bluetooth 2.0 + EDR & A2DP
3.2-megapixel rear-facing camera with fixed-focus
Mini USB (HTC ExtUSB)
microSD slot (SD 2.0 compatible)
Operating system: Windows Mobile 6.1 Professional
Input devices: touchscreen, touch-sensitive front panel buttons
Battery: 1100 mAh
Talk time: 360 minutes for WCDMA, 400 minutes for GSM
Standby time: 450 hours for WCDMA, 365 hours for GSM
Size:  (h)  (w)  (d)
Weight:  with battery

References

See also
HTC Touch

HTC smartphones
Windows Mobile Professional devices